The 2020–21 Highland Football League (known as the Breedon Highland League for sponsorship reasons) was the 118th season of the Highland Football League, and the 7th season as the fifth tier of the Scottish football pyramid system.

Due to the COVID-19 pandemic, the league announced in August 2020 that the season would start in October with a shortened a 16-game schedule (teams playing each other once). In late September, the start date was deferred until at least 28 November because the member clubs said they could not play fixtures without fans. The season started on 28 November, but Forres Mechanics withdrew just beforehand (reducing the schedule to 15 games).

On 11 January 2021 the league was suspended by the Scottish Football Association due to the escalating pandemic situation.

Despite having only completed three fixtures, Brora Rangers were declared champions for the second successive season using a points per game formula. The decision was announced by the Highland League on 30 March 2021. Two teams (Clachnacuddin and Fort William) had only played one game and Strathspey Thistle had not played at all.

Brora Rangers faced the winners of the 2020–21 Lowland Football League (Kelty Hearts) in the Pyramid play-off, losing 6–1 on aggregate.

Teams

Stadia and locations
All grounds are equipped with floodlights as required by league regulations.

Withdrawn

League table

Results

Notes

References

External links

Highland Football League seasons
5
SCO
Scotland